The men's road race H1-2 cycling event at the 2020 Summer Paralympics took place on 1 September 2021, at the Fuji Speedway in Tokyo. 14 riders competed in the event.

The event covers the following two classifications, all of which uses hand-operated bicycles:
H1: tetraplegics with severe upper limb impairment to the C6 vertebra.
H2: tetraplegics with minor upper limb impairment from C7 thru T3.

Results
The event took place on 1 September 2021, at 9:35:

References

Men's road race H1-2